Phuntsho Rapten is a Bhutanese politician who has been an appointed member of the National Council of Bhutan, since May 2018. Previously, he was an appointed member of the National Council of Bhutan from 2015 to 2018.

References 

Members of the National Council (Bhutan)
1973 births
Living people